Jefferson High School is a high school located in Edgewater, Colorado, United States. It is operated by Jefferson County Public Schools.

History

Academics

Extracurricular activities

Athletics 

Baseball
Jefferson County league baseball champions in 1967, 1968, 1969. AAA State Champions 1968. 3rd place in state tournament 1969.

Basketball 
In 1978, the Saints advanced to the final four in the Colorado State basketball tournament.

Academics 
In 1980, the Saints Debate team advanced to the Colorado State Finals, after coming in second in the Jefferson County tournament.

Notable alumni

 Brian Boatright (1980) - Associate Justice Colorado Supreme Court
 Ron Kiefel (1978) - cyclist
 Ed Perlmutter (1971) - US Congressman 7th District Colorado

Demographics
Enrollment in the 2010–2011 school year was 598 students. The student body's demographics were:

13.5% White
4.0% African American
78.6% Latino
1.5% Native American
0.7% Asian
1.7% Mixed race

Using federal government guidelines, 87.6% of the students were eligible for free or reduced-price lunches.

References

External links
 

Educational institutions established in 1955
Public high schools in Colorado
Jefferson County Public Schools (Colorado)
Schools in Jefferson County, Colorado
1955 establishments in Colorado